The 2015 Vancouver Whitecaps FC 2 season is the team's first season of existence, and their first season in United Soccer League, the third-tier of the American soccer pyramid.

Competitions

USL

League table

Western Conference

Results summary

Results by round

Roster

References 

 

2015
Whitecaps FC 2
Whitecaps FC 2
Whitecaps FC 2